Some anti-war songs lament aspects of wars, while others satirize war. Most promote peace in some form, while others sing out against specific armed conflicts. Still others depict the physical and psychological destruction that warfare causes to soldiers, innocent civilians, and humanity as a whole. Many of these songs are considered protest songs, and some have been embraced by war-weary people, various peace movements, and peace activists.

General pacifist and anti-war songs

American Civil War

American Indian Wars

World War I

Spanish Civil War

World War II

Cold War and nuclear annihilation

Korean War

Vietnam War

Dominican Civil War

Soviet-Afghan War

The Troubles of Northern Ireland

Falklands War

Contras, Latin America

Yugoslav Wars

Gulf Wars, Iraq, 9/11, and the War on Terror

Russian invasion of Ukraine

Anti-draft

Traditional music
Apart from the various genres of modern music, some traditional and contemporary folk songs reflect the futile efforts of war and the attitudes of objectors prior to the major wars of the 20th century. Some of these include:
 "Ain't Gonna Study War No More" also known as "Down by the Riverside", and with a similar tune as "Hand Me down My Walking Cane" – African-American traditional anti-war song recorded by The Weavers and many others.
 "Arthur McBride" – While first curated in the 19th century, this song likely came into existence during the 17th century in response to the War of the Grand Alliance, or especially the Williamite War in Ireland, after which the Irish Jacobite army was sent to France as agreed in the Treaty of Limerick on 3 October 1691.
 "The Cruel War" – Made famous in its current form by Pete Seeger and Peter Paul and Mary, this anti-war song has roots at least as far back as the American Civil War, and can probably be traced to an older English song.
 "Johnny I Hardly Knew Ye" – Irish traditional anti-war and anti-recruiting song that was the basis for the song "When Johnny Comes Marching Home", and recorded as "Fighting for Strangers" by Steeleye Span.
 "Join the British Army" – Irish rebel song, recorded by Ewan MacColl and The Dubliners.
 "Kannoneer Jabůrek" – popular Czech song mocking war heroism, referring to the events of the 1866 Austro-Prussian War
 "Lincoln's Army" – The Irish Rovers
 "Lowlands of Holland" – traditional recorded by Martin Carthy
 "Mrs. McGrath" – an Irish song describing a young man named Ted who enters the British Army and returns seven years later having lost his legs to a cannonball while fighting against Napoleon presumably at the Battle of Fuentes de Oñoro (fought between 3 and 5 May 1811). Bruce Springsteen recorded a version of this song on his 2006 album We Shall Overcome: The Seeger Sessions, and it appears on the subsequent live 2007 album Bruce Springsteen with The Sessions Band: Live in Dublin

Musicals

Concept albums

See also
 Anti-war movement
 Protest songs
 List of anti-war books
 List of anti-war films
 List of anti-war plays
 List of peace activists
Vietnam War Song Project

Notes

References

External links
 Anti-war Songs a website collecting thousands of antiwar songs from all over the world
 Folk&More: Songbook & Tabs a growing collection of chords, tabs, and lyrics of anti-war songs from Bob Dylan to Bob Marley
 Vietnam War Song Project, a collection of over 5000 Vietnam War songs, including hundreds containing anti-war / peace sentiment.

Anti-war songs
Anti-war